Nizam's Museum or H.E.H Nizam's Museum is a museum located in Hyderabad at Purani Haveli, a palace of the erstwhile Nizams. This museum showcases the gifts that the last Nizam of Hyderabad State, Osman Ali Khan, Asaf Jah VII received on his silver jubilee celebrations.

The museum is a repository mainly of souvenirs, gifts and mementos presented by dignitaries to the last Nizam on the occasion of the silver jubilee celebrations in 1936. Models made of silver of all the landmark buildings in Hyderabad, with citations about them in Urdu.

History 
The museum was opened on 18 February 2000 by the Nizam Trust to the general public.

2018 Theft
This museum became part of the national news in September 2018 as two Hyderabadi youths managed to steal a golden tiffin box studded with diamonds, and some other valuable items by dodging the CCTV cameras and security at the museum. Both were soon caught by the police and the security at the museum was beefed up after the incident.

Collections 
A golden throne used for the silver jubilee celebrations of the last Nizam, a gold tiffin box inlaid with diamonds, miniature replica of the Jubilee Hall, glass inlaid painting of Mir Osman Ali Khan, a wooden writing box studded with mother-of-pearl, diamonds and other precious stone studded golden daggers, caskets, and silver ittardans (perfume containers) presented by the Raja of Palvancha, Silver coffee cups studded with diamonds and silver filigree elephant with mahout, replica made of silver of a tree with Lord Krishna playing are on display.

A 1930 Rolls-Royce, Packard and a Jaguar Mark V are among the vintage cars on display.

The museum also features the wardrobe of the sixth nizam which was also the world's biggest (176 ft long) or largest walk through wardrobe and is one of its kind, a 150-year-old manually operated lift, and 200-year-old proclamation drums.

See also
The Nizam’s Museum Full tour

External links

Official Nizams Museum Website
Times of India feature
 The Hindu feature on mysterious Nizam's cabinet
 Times of India

References

Art museums and galleries in India
Museums in Hyderabad, India
Hyderabad State
Museums established in 2000
2000 establishments in Andhra Pradesh
Biographical museums in India
Tourist attractions in Hyderabad, India